Elections were held in the organized municipalities in the Cochrane District of Ontario on October 22, 2018 in conjunction with municipal elections across the province. (X) denotes an incumbent candidate.

Black River-Matheson

Mayor

Town Council

Source:

Cochrane

Mayor

Town Council

Source:

Hearst
List of candidates:

Mayor

Town Council

Fauquier-Strickland

Mayor

Town Council

Source:

Iroquois Falls
List of candidates:

Mayor

Town Council

Kapuskasing
List of candidates:

Mayor

Town Council

Mattice-Val Côté

Mayor

Source:

Moonbeam

Mayor

Source:

Moosonee

Opasatika

Source:

Smooth Rock Falls

Mayor

Town Council

Source:

Timmins
List of candidates:

Results are as follows:

Mayor

Timmins City Council

Val Rita-Harty

Mayor

Source:

References

Cochrane
Cochrane District